Quirinus may refer to:

Quirinus, a Roman god

A given name
Saint Quirinus (disambiguation), several different saints with the name Quirinus
Quirinus van Amelsfoort (1760–1820), Dutch painter
Quirinus Harder (1801–1880), Dutch architect
Quirinus Kuhlmann  (1651–1689), German poet and mystic
Quirinus Quirrell, a fictional teacher in Harry Potter and the Philosopher's Stone

See also
Quirinius, Roman aristocrat, Governor of Syria
Angelo Maria Quirini or Querini, Italian Cardinal
Elisabetta Querini or Quirini, Dogaressa of Venice
Querini Stampalia (disambiguation), family name

ca:Quirí (desambiguació)